Jejere (Tumour) is a 2018 Nigerian film all about a man in a new environment. It was produced by Sim Line International and the shooting took place for three days at  oshogbo.

Premier 
The film, which was produced by Laide Bakare was premiered at Orchid Hotel in Lagos, and it was attended by different celebrities as well as government officials.

Cast 
Starring in the film are Abolore Adegbola Akande, Akin Lewis, Ebun Oloyede, Laide Bakare Emeka Ike, Oby Alex O, and Fathia Balogun.

Synopsis 
A woman is been pressured by her husband to give him a male a boy after 8 girls, despite her failing health. The film also address contemporary issues such as kidnapping, unemployment, and corruption.

References 

2018 films
Nigerian drama films
English-language Nigerian films